Hotel de Love is a 1996 Australian film written and directed by Craig Rosenberg. It was released theatrically in the United States, Great Britain, Australia and select countries throughout Europe.

Plot
Fraternal twin brothers meet a childhood crush at a rundown hotel and rediscover their love as they renew their competition for her affection.

Principal cast

Production
The film was the directorial debut of Craig Rosenberg, an Australian writer who had been making a living writing screenplays in Los Angeles. David Parker was producer. Rosenberg:
Working with David Parker was an absolute joy. He's so experienced; he has written, produced and shot feature movies. To have him as producer on my first feature was a remarkable luxury for me because, if I had a writing problem, I could throw it to him and say, 'What do you think about this? Read this page for me'. If I had some shooting problem I would say, 'What do you think about this?' as well as having him do his normal production responsibilities. So he was a real godsend. He was a dream and he's a lovely person and I think we've formed a long friendship out of the experience.

Soundtrack

1. Get Down Tonight - KC and the Sunshine Band
2. Sooner or Later - The Grass Roots
3. I'm Not in Love - 10cc
4. In a Minor Key - Tim Finn
5. Reminiscing - Little River Band 
6. Blue Moon Revisited (Song for Elvis) - Cowboy Junkies 
7. Sway - Hotel de Love Band
8. Lost in Love - Air Supply
9. In Love With It All - Tim Finn
10. I Honestly Love You - Olivia Newton-John
11. I Hope I Never - Split Enz
12. Love Will Keep Us Together - The Brett Rosenberg Problem

Critical reception
The film received mixed reviews.

Roger Ebert of the Chicago Sun-Times somewhat enjoyed the film, giving it 2 and 1/2 stars out of 4:

Stephen Holden of The New York Times called it an "enjoyably ditsy romantic comedy" and "an enlightened 1990's version of a French farce."

See also
Cinema of Australia

References

External links

Hotel De Love at Oz Movies

1996 films
1996 romantic comedy films
Australian romantic comedy films
Films set in hotels
Films shot in Melbourne
Village Roadshow Pictures films
1990s English-language films